Nitya Pibulsonggram (June 30, 1941 – May 24, 2014) was a Thai career diplomat and politician.

Careers and education
After receiving his B.A. in government from Dartmouth College and his M.A. in political science from Brown University, he joined Thailand's Foreign Service in 1968. Between 1984 and 2000 he was ambassador Extraordinary and Plenipotentiary of Thailand to the United States and then few years later, he became Thailand's Ambassador and Permanent Representative to the United Nation in New York. He served briefly as the Thai Ministry of Foreign Affairs' Permanent Secretary (the most senior civil servant of the Ministry) before retiring from bureaucratic career.

After his retirement, he served as advisor to the foreign minister and as Thailand's chief negotiator for a Thai-US free trade agreement negotiations.

In 2006 he was appointed by the military junta to be Foreign Minister of Thailand, serving in that post until early 2008.

At Dartmouth College, Nitya Pibulsonggram was a member of Kappa Kappa Kappa society class of 1962.

Family
He was the sixth child of Field Marshal Plaek Phibunsongkhram and Than Phu Ying La-iad Bhandhukravi with three sisters and two  brothers. One of them, Prasong, was a Vice-Admiral who had served under the Royal Thai Armed Forces.

Died
Nitya died of a stroke from leukemia on 24 May 2014, he was 72 years old.

References

External links

  Biography
Biography of the Thai Embassy in the USA

1941 births
Brown University alumni
Nitya Pibulsonggram
Dartmouth College alumni
2014 deaths
Nitya Pibulsonggram
Cantonese people
Nitya Pibulsonggram
Nitya Pibulsonggram
Nitya Pibulsonggram